The Tchicaya U Tam'si Prize for African Poetry, established in 1989, rewards a writer who is distinguished by an innovative poetic work, of high artistic value. The prize is named after Congolese writer Tchicaya U Tam'si (1931–1988).

It was created during the Assilah city's Forum (Morocco), on the initiative of Muhammad Benaissa, former Moroccan Minister of Culture and current Mayor of Assilah. The prize is generally awarded in August, during the international and cultural moussem (festival) of Assilah.

Alioune Badara Beye chaired the jury of the 2014 edition.

Winners
 1989 : Edouard Maunick (Mauritius)
 1990 : Jean-Luc Raharimanana (Madagascar)
 1991 : René Depestre (Haiti) 
 1993 : Mazisi Kunene (South Africa)
 1996 : Ahmed Abdel Muti Hijazi (or Mo'ti Higazi) (Egypt)
 1999 : Jean-Baptiste Tati Loutard (Congo-Brazzaville)
 2001 : Vera Duarte (Cape Verde) 
 2004 : Abdelkarim Tabbal (Morocco)
 2008 : Niyi Osundare (Nigeria)
 2011 : Fama Diagne Sène (Senegal) and Mehdi Akhrif (Morocco)
 2014 : Josué Guébo (Côte d'Ivoire) for Think of Lampedusa.
 2018 : Amadou Lamine Sall (Senegal).

References

External links
African Book Awards Database
Vera Duarte wins African poetry award
Osundare and the Tchicaya U’Tamsi Award
(fr) 2011 Winners
(fr) Josué Guébo, lauréat du Prix Tchicaya U Tamsi 2014

Awards established in 1989
African literary awards
1989 establishments in Morocco